Throughout U.S. history, various U.S. states conducted their own censuses. These censuses were often conducted every ten years, in years ending with a five to complement the U.S. federal census (which is carried out in years that end with zero). Also, some of these censuses were conducted in U.S. states while they were still U.S. territories (before they became U.S. states).

⊗ marks the point when statehood was attained.

References

United States census
Census